Henry (31 January 1512 – 31 January 1580), dubbed the Chaste and the Cardinal-King, was king of Portugal and a cardinal of the Catholic Church, who ruled Portugal between 1578 and 1580. As a clergyman, he was bound to chastity, and as such, had no children to succeed him, and thus put an end to the reigning House of Aviz. His death led to the Portuguese succession crisis of 1580 and ultimately to the 60-year Iberian Union that saw Portugal share a monarch with that of Habsburg Spain. The next independent monarch of Portugal would be John IV, who restored the throne after 60 years of Spanish rule.

Life
Born in Lisbon, Henry was the fifth son of King Manuel I of Portugal and Maria of Aragon.

Cardinal
As the younger brother of King John III of Portugal and a younger son in the Royal Family, Henry was not expected to succeed to the Portuguese throne. Early in his life, Henry took Holy Orders to promote Portuguese interests within the Catholic Church, then dominated by Spain. He rose rapidly through the Church hierarchy, becoming in quick succession Archbishop of Braga, Archbishop of Évora, and Grand Inquisitor before being made a cardinal in 1545, with the title of Santi Quattro Coronati.  From 1564 to 1570 he was Archbishop of Lisbon. Henry, more than anyone, endeavoured to bring the Jesuits to Portugal to encourage their activity in the colonial empire.

Reign
Henry served as regent for his great-nephew King Sebastian, replacing his sister-in-law and Sebastian's grandmother Queen dowager Catherine, following her resignation from the role in 1562. King Sebastian died without an heir in the disastrous Battle of Alcácer Quibir that took place in 1578, and the elderly cardinal was proclaimed king soon after. Henry sought to be released from his ecclesiastical vows so he could take a bride and pursue the continuation of the Aviz dynasty, but Pope Gregory XIII, not wanting to antagonize Philip II of Spain, did not grant him that release.

Death and succession
The Cardinal-King died in Almeirim, on his 68th birthday, without having appointed a successor, leaving only a regency to care for the kingdom. One of the closest dynastic claimants was King Philip II of Spain who, in November 1580, sent the Duke of Alba to claim Portugal by force. Lisbon soon fell, and Philip was elected king of Portugal at the Portuguese Cortes of Tomar in 1581—on the condition that the kingdom and its overseas territories would not become Spanish provinces.

Ancestry

See also 
Struggle for the throne of Portugal
War of the Portuguese Succession
Descendants of Manuel I of Portugal

Notes

Bibliography

External links 

1512 births
1580 deaths
16th-century Portuguese cardinals
16th-century Portuguese monarchs
Archbishops of Lisbon
Bishops of Évora
House of Aviz
Portuguese infantes
Regents of Portugal
Roman Catholic archbishops of Braga